Appilly is a commune in the Oise department in northern France.

Population

See also
 Communes of the Oise department
 Monument aux morts (Oise)

References

Communes of Oise